Francis Joseph (6 March 1960 – 18 November 2022) was an English professional footballer who played as a forward for a large number of clubs in the Football League, including Wimbledon, Brentford, Reading, Sheffield United, Crewe Alexandra, Fulham, Barnet and Gillingham, between 1980 and 1992. He also spent time playing outside the United Kingdom, including spells with Honka, JYP 77 and HJK Helsinki in Finland, Racing Ghent in Belgium and Tampa Bay Rowdies in the United States. He eventually dropped into non-League football, playing for numerous clubs before becoming a coach at non-League level in 1995.

Career

League career
Born in Kilburn, London, Joseph began his professional career with Wimbledon in 1980. He scored on his Football League debut, having come on as a substitute in a home game against Darlington. Gaining a regular place in the Wimbledon first team Joseph was voted the club's 'Player of the Year' at the end of his first season. Following loan spells with Honka and JYP 77 in Finland, Joseph moved to Brentford in the summer of 1982 for £40,000, scoring 50 goals during his first two seasons at Griffin Park, before suffering a broken leg September 1984 and a repeat of the injury during the second game of his comeback the following year. Having recovered from his injury late in the 1985–86 season, Joseph never fully regained his form and although making over 100 appearances for Brentford over five years, he left to join Reading for £20,000 in July 1987. Prior to his departure from Brentford, Joseph had spent time on loan back at Wimbledon and at HJK Helsinki in Finland in the early part of 1987, and while at Reading he was also loaned to both Bristol Rovers and Aldershot in 1988.

In July 1988, Joseph's former manager at Wimbledon, Dave Bassett, signed him on a free transfer for Bassett's new side Sheffield United. Joseph again made an impressive start, scoring on his league debut for United against his old club Reading in August 1988 but picked up an injury during the game. Joseph was never able to reclaim a regular place in United's first team and was used only sparingly as United were promoted from Division Three.

From United he headed to Gillingham who paid £5,000 for his services in March 1989, and then played for a number of clubs in rapid succession including Crewe Alexandra, Fulham, Racing Ghent in Belgium, Tampa Bay Rowdies in the United States and Barnet.

Non-League career
Following his departure from Barnet, Joseph moved between a number of clubs in non-League football including Slough Town, Wokingham Town, Leatherhead, Dulwich Hamlet, Chertsey Town, Walton & Hersham and Chesham before returning to Chertsey Town to become player coach in November 1995. Joseph later became coach of Wealdstone for whom he had played as a teenager.

Personal life and death
Joseph was the older brother of footballer Roger Joseph. Their mother was from Dominica.

Joseph died on 18 November 2022, at the age of 62.

References

1960 births
2022 deaths
English people of Dominica descent
English footballers
Footballers from Kilburn, London
Association football forwards
English Football League players
National League (English football) players
Veikkausliiga players
American Professional Soccer League players
Wealdstone F.C. players
Hillingdon Borough F.C. players
Wimbledon F.C. players
FC Honka players
JJK Jyväskylä players
Brentford F.C. players
Helsingin Jalkapalloklubi players
Reading F.C. players
Bristol Rovers F.C. players
Aldershot F.C. players
Sheffield United F.C. players
Gillingham F.C. players
Crewe Alexandra F.C. players
Fulham F.C. players
Tampa Bay Rowdies (1975–1993) players
Barnet F.C. players
Slough Town F.C. players
Wokingham & Emmbrook F.C. players
Leatherhead F.C. players
Dulwich Hamlet F.C. players
Chertsey Town F.C. players
Walton & Hersham F.C. players
Wokingham Town F.C. players
English expatriate footballers
English expatriate sportspeople in Finland
Expatriate footballers in Finland
English expatriate sportspeople in Belgium
Expatriate footballers in Belgium
English expatriate sportspeople in the United States
Expatriate soccer players in the United States
Chertsey Town F.C. managers
Wealdstone F.C. managers
Association football coaches
Black British sportspeople